In the theories of modulation and of stochastic processes, random modulation is the creation of a new signal from two other signals by the process of quadrature amplitude modulation. In particular, the two signals are considered as being random processes. For applications, the two original signals need have a limited frequency range, and these are used to modulate a third sinusoidal carrier signal whose frequency is above the range of frequencies contained in the original signals.

Details

It applies quadrature modulation to combine these with a carrier frequency  (with ) to form the signal  given by

where  is the equivalent baseband representation of the modulated signal 

Bibliography 

Statistical signal processing